Stone paper products, also referred to as bio-plastic paper, mineral paper or rich mineral paper, are strong and durable paper-like materials manufactured from calcium carbonate bonded with high-density polyethylene (HDPE) resin. They are used in many of the same applications as cellulose-based paper.

Properties
Stone paper has a density range of 1.0-1.6g/cm3, which is equal to or slightly higher than that of ordinary paper, and a texture somewhat like that of the outer membrane of a boiled egg. It is not biodegradable or compostable, but is photo-degradable under suitable conditions. It consists of roughly 80% calcium carbonate, 18% HDPE and 2% proprietary coating.

Because it is not made from cellulose fibers, stone paper can have a smoother surface than most traditional products, eliminating the need for additional coating or lamination. The calcium carbonate is mined from quarries or precipitated from limestone. The production of stone paper uses no acid, bleach or optical brighteners. It can be recycled into new stone paper, but only if recycled separately at dedicated civic amenity sites.

Stone paper products are compatible with inkjet or solid ink printers (e.g., offset, letterpress, gravure, flexographic) but do not respond well to very high temperature laser printers.

Sustainability
Comparisons have been made between stone paper and traditional paper for applications like book printing in Europe. If stone paper replaced coated and uncoated graphic printing stock in Europe, it could potentially reduce CO₂ emissions by 25% to 62%, water consumption by 89% to 99.2%, and wood usage by 100% compared to current European consumption, which is mostly of virgin paper. The environmental benefits of stone paper relative to recycled paper are much less substantial.

References

Paper
Materials
Packaging materials